Deeba, is a Pakistani film actress. She was one of the leading film actresses during the 1960s and 1970s, well known for her romantic and tragic roles in Urdu and Punjabi films. She has received a Nigar Award and Pride of Performance. She is known as the "Pakistani Mona Lisa".

Early life and career
Deeba (Birth name:Raheela) was born at Ranchi, Bihar, British India on 1 August 1947. In the 1950s, she was living with her married sister near Karachi Cantt. Station (a railway station) in a slum area of Karachi. She started her career as a child actress in the film Miss 56 (1956) and was nicknamed "Chutanki" as she was still a little girl.

She got a breakthrough in Chiragh Jalta Raha (1962), a Fazal Karim Fazli's film. Her performances in several films, such as Milan (1964), Khamosh Raho (1964), Aina (1966), Payal ki jhankar (1966), Doraha, Sangdil (1968), Dard (1969), Sajna Door Diya (1970), Neend hamarey khuwab tumharey (1971), Ansoo (1971), Pardes (1972), and Seeta Maryam Margaret (1978) have won critical acclaim. She played many supporting characters, including on-screen mother in several films throughout most of the 1980s and 1990s. She acted in several television plays in early 2000s.

Personal life

Childhood tragedy
Deeba, as a child, had lost her father, and then she got separated from her mother too in East Pakistan (now Bangladesh). She migrated to Karachi along with her guardian uncle and aunt. She didn't have any clue about the whereabouts of her mother till she started working in movies. In 1964, during the filming of her movie "Milan", her picture was published in a Dhaka film magazine. Her mother saw that picture and recognized her as her daughter Raheela. The Bengali writer Mohiuddin Nawab, who happened to be a neighbor of Deeba's mother in Dhaka, heard her story and wrote to the magazine. When Deeba read about her mother in the magazine, she immediately looked for her estranged mother and soon found her. Later, she took her mother along with her to Lahore.

Marriage
Deeba married cameraman Naeem Rizvi in 1971 and left the silver screen for 10 years. However, financial hardships made her join the Pakistani film industry again in 1987 as a supporting actress. She has three children her daughter, Madiha Rizvi is an actress, and her son Imran Rizvi is an actor.

Pakistani Mona Lisa
Deeba's smiling face and innocent look have given rise to the tag "Pakistani Mona Lisa".

List of television projects

Television series

Telefilm

Filmography

Film

Awards and recognition

See also 
 List of Pakistani actresses

References

External links
 
 

1947 births
Living people
People from Ranchi
Pakistani film actresses
Nigar Award winners
20th-century Pakistani actresses
Actresses in Bengali cinema
21st-century Pakistani actresses
Actresses from Jharkhand
Actresses in Urdu cinema
Actresses in Punjabi cinema
Pakistani television actresses
Actresses in Pashto cinema
Actresses in Sindhi cinema
Muhajir people
Recipients of the Pride of Performance